Duke of Victoria de las Amezcoas is a hereditary title in the Peerage of Spain, accompanied by the dignity of Grandee and granted posthumously in 1836 by carlist pretender to the throne Infante Carlos as Charles V to Tomás de Zumalacárregui, captain general of the Carlist army, along with the Countship of Zumalacárregui.

The title makes reference to the military victories of Zumalacárregui, particularly in the Amezcoas region of Navarre. Although it was originally granted as "Duke of la Victoria" (duque de la Victoria), Francisco Franco added the suffix "de las Amezcoas" in 1955 to distinguish it from the existing Dukedom of la Victoria, which had been granted in 1839 by Isabella II to Zumalacárregui's enemy, Baldomero Espartero.

Dukes of la Victoria (1836)

Tomás de Zumalacárregui e Imaz, 1st Duke of Victoria de las Amezcoas

Dukes of la Victoria de las Amezcoas (1955)
José Manuel de Oraá y Mendía, 2nd Duke of Victoria de las Amezcoas
José Manuel de Oraá y Sanz, 3rd Duke of Victoria de las Amezcoas
Francisco Javier de Oraá y Moyua, 4th Duke of Victoria de las Amezcoas

See also
List of dukes in the peerage of Spain
List of current Grandees of Spain

References 

Dukedoms of Spain
Grandees of Spain
Lists of dukes
Lists of Spanish nobility